Anthem for a New Tomorrow is the sixth studio album by the American punk rock band Screeching Weasel. It was released in 1993 through Lookout! Records. According to Contemporary Musician, Anthem for a New Tomorrow is "widely regarded as one of the band's best efforts".

Album trivia
Anthem for a New Tomorrow was recorded after the Screeching Weasel returned from their 1993 U.S. tour, which was their last. The liner notes of the album read "Hey! You've heard them, now go SEE them!"  The title is taken from the song "Second Floor East" from their previous album, Wiggle.  Mass Giorgini recorded the album at his Sonic Iguana Studio. All songs on the album were taken from this session except "Every Night" and "Totally", which the band felt were better represented by demo recordings they'd done months earlier at Flat Iron Studios with Andy Ernst. After their last album, the band lost bassist Johnny Personality. Rather than find a replacement, guitarist Danny Vapid switched to bass and Ben Weasel took over second guitar. This later came to be known as the band's "classic" lineup. In contrast with the albums and EPs that preceded Anthem for a New Tomorrow, the vast majority of the writing was done by Ben Weasel alone. Only one song, "Trance," out of 18 was co-written with bassist Danny Vapid.  Vapid later remarked that "to suggest anything else would've ruined the mix." The album has been described by the band as a concept album, dealing with issues of alienation, paranoia, and isolation in modern society.  In the liner notes of the Asian Man released version of the album, Weasel and Vapid both say the sound of the album was heavily influenced by Wire's Pink Flag. Weasel has said that he wanted the album to sound "like a panic attack."  

The album was remastered and re-released by Asian Man Records in 2005.

Track listing

Personnel
 Ben Weasel - lead vocals, guitar
 Jughead - guitar
 Danny Vapid - bass, backing vocals
 Danny Panic - drums
 Fat Mike - backing vocals on "Peter Brady"
 Blake Schwarzenbach - backing vocals on "A New Tomorrow"
 Cassandra Millspaugh - backing vocals on "A New Tomorrow"
 Joey Vindictive - backing vocals on "A New Tomorrow"

Reception and influence 
In 2022, Dustin Kensrue of the modern rock band Thrice listed Anthem for a New Tomorrow as one of the top albums which influenced him as a musician. Kensrue describes the album as having "a lighthearted, weird playfulness at times...very serious political ramifications sometimes, and...just a sort of honesty and raw quality" that makes it distinctive from other music. Bass guitarist Mark Rubano of Taking Back Sunday also named Anthem for a New Tomorrow as one of the top two albums he listened to as a teen.

References

1993 albums
Screeching Weasel albums
Lookout! Records albums
Asian Man Records albums